In physics, shell model can mean:
 Nuclear shell model, how protons and neutrons are arranged in an atom nucleus
 Electron shell, how electrons are arranged in an atom or molecule

SHELL model
ja:殻模型